Lamp (ランプ, Ranpu) is a Japanese indie band formed in 2000.

History

Formation 
Someya started playing guitar in middle school. In the folk club during high school, he became friends with Nagai through their common love of 60’s music. During college, when a friend introduced Sakakibara to Someya, he decided to start Lamp.

2003–2011: Early years and first six albums 
On 9 April 2003, Lamp released their first album, Soyokaze Apartment Room 201 (そよ風アパートメント201). Someya has cited manga artist Yoshiharu Tsuge as influence for the first album's lyrics. 

On 11 February 2004, they released their second album, For Lovers (恋人へ). Despite selling less than their first album, For Lovers became a fan favorite over the years.

On 25 May 2005, they released their third album, Komorebi Dori Nite (木洩陽通りにて).

On 7 March 2007, they released their compilation album, Zankou (残光).

On 3 December 2008, they released their fourth album, Lamp Genso (ランプ幻想).

On 4 August 2010, they released their fifth album, The Poetry Of August (八月の詩情).

On 9 February 2011, they released their sixth album, Tokyo Utopia Correspondence (東京ユウトピア通信). The album cover was drawn by manga artist Ouji Suzuki (鈴木翁二).

2014–present: Botanical House, Tours, Yume, Her Watch, Stardust In Blue 
On 5 February 2014, Lamp released their seventh album, Yume (ゆめ). The album cover was drawn by illustrator Sēichi Hayashi (林静一). In 2014, they started their own label Botanical House. They performed at BEATRAM MUSIC FESTIVAL in Toyama Castle Park. They collaborated with San Francisco-based band The Bilinda Butchers on their debut album, Heaven.

In 2015, they performed at HELLO INDIE in Sendai.

On 13 March 2015, they released their compilation album, Ame ni Hana (雨に花).

In 2017, they toured in China, including Shenzhen, Beijing, and Shanghai. On 20 April, they performed in Taipei.

On 15 May 2018, they released their seventh album, Her Watch (彼女の時計). On 23 July, they released the single, "Tabibito/Place in my dream (旅人／夢の国)". On 1 August 2018, they released the split single, "Blue/Girlfriend (ブルー／Girlfriend)," a collaboration with The Bilinda Butchers. In August and September, Lamp held the Lamp Asia Tour 2018 "A Distant Shore", performing in cities such as Beijing, Tokyo, Fukuoka, Seoul, Hong Kong, and Taipei. In October, they performed at Kirari Music Festival in Fujimi.

On 8 September 2020, they released Stardust In Blue with vocalist Kaede and features vocals from UWANOSORA. They have background vocals on all tracks except for Jupiter, which only has Kaede and UWANOSORA.

Style and influences 
Lamp's style has been described as Shibuya-kei, city pop, and café music, but they have also been described as difficult to place into one genre. The band often incorporates elements of bossa nova, jazz, soul, and funk into their music. They have cited Brazilian music, The Beatles, The Beach Boys, and Simon & Garfunkel as influences.

Members 
 Taiyo Someya (染谷大陽; born 13 November 1979) – guitar, synthesizer, vibraphone
 Yusuke Nagai (永井祐介; born 22 July 1980) – vocals, guitar, bass, keyboard
 Kaori Sakakibara (榊原香保里; born 17 November 1979) – vocals, flute, accordion

Discography

Studio albums 

 Soyokaze Apartment Room 201, そよ風アパートメント201 (2002)
 For Lovers, 恋人へ (2004)
 Komorebi Dori Nite, 木洩陽通りにて (2005)
 Lamp Genso, ランプ幻想 (2008)
 The Poetry Of August, 八月の詩情 (2010)
 Tokyo Utopia Correspondence, 東京ユウトピア通信 (2011)
 Yume, ゆめ (2014) - 
 Her Watch, 彼女の時計 (2018)
Stardust In Blue, 秋の惑星、ハートはナイトブルー。(2020)

Live album 

 "A Distant Shore" Asia Tour 2018 (2019)

Compilations 

 Zankou, 残光 (2007)
 Ame ni Hana, 雨に花 (2016)

Singles 

 "Tabibito/Place in my dream, 旅人／夢の国" (2018)
 Blue/Girlfriend, ブルー／Girlfriend" (2018)

Other works 

 Ame ni Hana, 雨に花 (2005)
 How Long (2010)
 Rain, long‐continued rain, 雨、降り続く雨 (2014)
 One night, 或る夜 (2014)
 Fantasy/Train window, Fantasy／車窓 (2018)
 Memory of Soda Pop, ソーダ水の想い出 (2018)
 Demo compilation, the shine that never returns, デモ音源集 戻らない輝きは (2018)

Bibliography 

 SONG BOOK 2003-2007 (2016)

External links 

 Lamp Official Site
 Blog:こぬか雨はコーヒーカップの中へ

Reference 

Japanese musical trios
Musical groups established in 2000
Japanese musical groups